Dead Ringers is a British radio and television comedy impressions show broadcast on BBC Radio 4 and later BBC Two. The programme was devised by producer Bill Dare and developed with Jon Holmes, Andy Hurst and Simon Blackwell. Among its stars was Jan Ravens. The BBC cancelled the television run in 2007 after five years. Dead Ringers''' return to Radio 4 was announced in 2014.

History
The programme first aired on BBC Radio 4 in January 2000. Dead Ringers returned to radio in July 2014.

In November 2001 BBC One said it had commissioned a pilot for a television version. The pilot was well received and in August 2002 a full series was commissioned, this time on BBC Two. The TV show ran for seven series and was axed in April 2009. In 2002 the BBC's Arena broadcast a documentary about the series entitled Radio Ha! - Meet The Dead Ringers, directed by Fisher Dilke. It featured interviews with the cast and writers, and behind-the-scenes footage from a studio recording from the eighth series.

Awards

|-
| 2001
| Dead Ringers| Radio Academy Awards Gold - The Comedy Award
| 
|-
| 2001
| Dead Ringers| Broadcasting Press Guild Award for Best Radio Programme
| 
|-
| 2001
| Dead Ringers| The British Comedy Awards - Best Radio Comedy
| 
|-
| 2001
| Dead Ringers''
| The Heritage Foundation Awards - Best Radio Comedy Show
| 
|}

Seasons

Home media

Radio series

TV series

References

External links

/radio4

Old Homepage

BBC television sketch shows
BBC Radio comedy programmes
British satirical television series
2000s British political television series
2000s British satirical television series
2000s British television sketch shows
2000 radio programme debuts
2014 radio programme debuts
2007 radio programme endings
British radio sketch shows
2002 British television series debuts
2007 British television series endings
Radio programs adapted into television shows
Television series produced at Pinewood Studios
Television series based on radio series
Dead Ringers
Television series by BBC Studios